María Pía Fernández Moreira (born 1 April 1995) is a Uruguayan middle-distance runner. She has won multiple medals at regional level.

Her personal best of 4:09.45 is the current national record in the 1500 metres.

International competitions

Personal bests
Outdoor
2017, 10 kilometres 36:02 (Montevideo)
2018, 800 metres 2:05.96 (Castres)
2018, 3000 metres 9:12.80 (Kessel-Lo)
2019, 3000 metres steeplechase 10:37.12 (Montevideo)
2019, 1500 metres 4:09.45 (Doha) NR

References

1995 births
Living people
Uruguayan female middle-distance runners
Athletes (track and field) at the 2015 Pan American Games
Athletes (track and field) at the 2019 Pan American Games
Pan American Games competitors for Uruguay
People from Trinidad, Uruguay
South American Championships in Athletics winners
Ibero-American Championships in Athletics winners
Athletes (track and field) at the 2020 Summer Olympics
Olympic athletes of Uruguay